Charles Henry Hart (July 5, 1866 – September 29, 1934) was a general authority and a member of the First Council of the Seventy of the Church of Jesus Christ of Latter-day Saints. Hart also served as president of the Canadian Mission of the LDS Church from 1927 to 1930.

Hart was born at Bloomington, Bear Lake County, Idaho Territory. When he was called as a member of the First Council of the Seventy in April 1906 he became the first general authority born in Idaho. He died from pneumonia at Salt Lake City, Utah.

Notes

References
 Deseret News Church Almanac, 2005 ed., p. 72.

External links
Grampa Bill's G.A. Pages: Charles H. Hart

1866 births
1934 deaths
20th-century Mormon missionaries
American general authorities (LDS Church)
American Mormon missionaries in Canada
Deaths from pneumonia in Utah
Mission presidents (LDS Church)
People from Bear Lake County, Idaho
Presidents of the Seventy (LDS Church)
Religious leaders from Idaho